Maxim Yuryevich Razumov (born 12 January 1990) is a Russian former professional cyclist.

Major results

2010
 1st Udmurt Republic Stage Race
2011
 2nd Overall Friendship People North-Caucasus Stage Race
1st Stage 2
 2nd Memorial Viktor Kapitonov
 3rd Road race, National Under-23 Road Championships
2012
 9th ZLM Tour
2013
 1st Overall Five Rings of Moscow
 1st Stage 3 (TTT) Tour des Fjords
 2nd Overall Grand Prix of Sochi
1st Points classification
1st Stages 2, 3 & 5
2014
 4th Duo Normand (with Maxim Pokidov)
 5th Overall Five Rings of Moscow
1st Stage 1
 5th Grand Prix de la Ville de Lillers
 9th Overall Istrian Spring Trophy
2015
 1st Stage 1 (TTT) Grand Prix of Sochi
 1st Stage 1 (TTT) Grand Prix of Adygeya
 5th Overall Tour of Kuban

References

External links

1990 births
Living people
Sportspeople from Lipetsk
Russian male cyclists
21st-century Russian people